Praticolella berlandieriana is a species of air-breathing land snail, a terrestrial pulmonate gastropod mollusk in the family Polygyridae.

References

Polygyridae

Gastropods described in 1833
Taxa named by Moïse Étienne Moricand